Idhu Namma Aalu can refer to two Indian Tamil-language films:

 Idhu Namma Aalu (1988 film)
 Idhu Namma Aalu (2016 film)